Pseudohemihyalea anapheoides is a moth in the family Erebidae first described by Walter Rothschild in 1909. It is found in Panama.

References

Moths described in 1909
anapheoides
Arctiinae of South America